Para Wirra Conservation Park (formerly Para Wirra Recreation Park and Para Wirra National Park) is a  protected area located in the foothills of the Mount Lofty Ranges in the northern end of the Adelaide metropolitan area in South Australia. The conservation park is part of a larger,  block of contiguous native vegetation, the remainder of which is owned by PIRSA Forestry, SA Water and private landholders.

See also
 List of protected areas in Adelaide

References

External links
Para Wirra Conservation Park official webpage
The Friends of Para Wirra Recreation Park webpage
Para Wirra Conservation Park webpage on the Protected Planet website
Para Wirra Conservation Park webpage on the BirdsSA website

Conservation parks of South Australia
Protected areas in Adelaide
Protected areas established in 1962
1962 establishments in Australia